Vathsalya Patha (Kannada: ವಾತ್ಸಲ್ಯಪಥ) is a 1980 Indian Kannada film, directed by A. S. R. Rao and produced by Devamma Range Gowda and A. S. N. Sharma. The film stars Suresh Heblikar, L. V. Sharada, Devadas and Meenakshi in the lead roles. The film has musical score by B. V. Karanth and Guna Singh.

Cast

 Suresh Heblikar
 L. V. Sharada
 Devadas
 Meenakshi
 Narasimhachar
 Dr. Sharada
 Basavaraj Vali
 Venkatesh Prasad
 B. Krishna
 Vijaya
 Puttaswamy Gowda
 J. Meera
 Rajarao
 Jayaram
 Gowrishankar
 M. S. Srinivasa Rao
 Baby Anuradha
 Baby Manjula
 Master Pradeep

References

External links
 

1980s Kannada-language films